Abdominoplasty or "tummy tuck" is a cosmetic surgery procedure used to make the abdomen thinner and more firm. The surgery involves the removal of excess skin and fat from the middle and lower abdomen in order to tighten the muscle and fascia of the abdominal wall. This type of surgery is usually sought by patients with loose or sagging tissues, that develop after pregnancy or major weight loss.

Procedures
Abdominoplasty operations vary in scope and are frequently subdivided into categories. Depending on the extent of the surgery, a complete abdominoplasty can take from 1 to 5 hours. A partial abdominoplasty (mini-tuck abdominoplasty) can be completed between 1 and 2 hours.

Complete abdominoplasty
In general, a complete or full abdominoplasty follows these steps:
 An incision is made from hip to hip just above the pubic area.
 Another incision is made to free the navel from the surrounding skin.
 The skin is detached from the abdominal wall to reveal the muscles and fascia to be tightened. The muscle fascia wall is tightened with sutures.
 Liposuction is often used to refine the transition zones of the abdominal sculpture.
 A dressing and sometimes a compression garment are applied and any excess fluid from the site is drained.

Partial abdominoplasty
A partial or mini abdominoplasty proceeds as follows:
 A smaller incision is made.
 The skin and fat of the lower abdomen are detached in a more limited fashion from the muscle fascia. The skin is stretched down and excess skin removed.
 Sometimes the belly button stalk is divided from the muscle below and the belly button slid down lower on the abdominal wall.
 Sometimes a portion of the abdominal muscle fascia wall is tightened.
 Liposuction is often used to contour the transition zone.
 The flap is stitched back into place.

Extended abdominoplasty
An extended abdominoplasty is a complete abdominoplasty plus a lateral thigh lift. The resulting scar runs from the posterior axillary line (when placing one's open hands on the hips, the thumbs lie along the posterior axillary line). The operation does all of the abdominal contouring of a complete abdominoplasty and allows further improvement of the flank (waist), as well as smoothing the contour of the upper lateral thigh.

High lateral tension tummy tuck
This is an advanced technique that takes a little more than four and half hours to perform. Conventional abdominoplasty tightens muscles in a vertical line. In this new method, known as high lateral tension abdominoplasty, in addition to vertical-line tightening, muscles are tightened horizontally. The result with this technique is a dramatically flat abdomen with significantly better-defined waistline.

Floating abdominoplasty or FAB technique
This new technique, also known as an extended mini abdominoplasty, allows for tightening and shaping through a smaller incision that is not placed around the belly button. Through this smaller incision, excess skin is removed and the belly button is temporarily detached, floating above the muscles during this process. The muscles are tightened and reshaped from sternum to pubic area. The skin is then tightened and the belly button is reattached, or moved down one or two cm if desired. Liposuction may also be performed to achieve desirable results.

Circumferential abdominoplasty
A circumferential abdominoplasty is an extended abdominoplasty plus a buttock lift. The resulting scar runs all the way around the body, and the operation is also called a Belt Lipectomy or lower body lift. This operation is most appropriate for patients who have undergone massive weight loss.

Combination procedures
An abdominoplasty can be combined with liposuction to make a Lipotuck, which performs body contouring around the hips, thighs, and buttocks.

It can also be combined with liposuction contouring, breast reduction, breast lift, or occasionally hysterectomy, depending on the reason for the hysterectomy. A popular name for breast enhancement procedures performed in conjunction with an abdominoplasty is a "mommy makeover".

Recovery
 Depends on the problem to be treated, surgical technique(s), and other factors. Can take one to four weeks and patients are advised to take at least a portion of this recovery time off from work.
 Heavy lifting is best avoided during this time.
 Initially there may be bruising and discomfort.
 A supportive abdominal binder or compression garment can minimize swelling / bruising, and support the repaired tissues. This compression garment is also effective in helping the skin in the treated area conform to its new shape.
 Patients are advised to avoid all forms of nicotine for a month or longer prior to surgery and also during the recovery period.
 Full recovery takes 3–6 months, with further fading of scars thereafter. Scars may appear red and prominent at first, but with proper care, they heal into a thin, silvery line.

Risks
Abdominoplasty carries certain risks that may be serious or life-threatening. When making the decision to undergo such a procedure it is recommended to compare the benefits with the potential risks and complications. Hence, all patients must be informed on all the risks they are exposing themselves to.
Severe complications occur however in rare cases and these include blood clots, thrombosis, cardiac and pulmonary complications or infection.

Infection and blood clots are a serious potential risk after abdominoplasty, but which occur rarely. Infection is usually treated with antibiotics and drainage. Patients are recommended to move around as soon as possible after surgery to minimize their risks of developing blood clots. Pulmonary embolism, heart attack or stroke are very rare complications that may result after any type of surgery due to immobility after surgery which results in blood clots that may travel to the heart, lung or brain. Thus, pulmonary embolism is a serious risk after "tummy tuck" procedure and if they occur, they commonly happen within three weeks of the surgery, but more commonly within the first 72 hours after the procedure has been performed.

If complications occur, they usually delay the healing process. In rare cases, another surgery is needed to fix a potential complication. Skin necrosis is one of the complications that may require another procedure as the dead skin must be replaced by a skin graft. Although necrosis is extremely rare, smokers have an increased risk to develop skin necrosis. Stopping nicotine use and smoking several weeks before and several weeks after surgery cleans the body and improves the chance of an uneventful recovery.

One of the more common problems after an abdominoplasty is collection of fluid under the skin after the drains have been removed. A surgeon can aspirate the fluid with a needle. The drainage stops within a month and does not affect the final results.

The scars resulting from abdominoplasty are long, large in appearance, and permanent. The size of the scar depends on the amount of skin that has been cut off, the techniques used for the surgery, the surgeon's skills, and the body's ability to recover. Although this scar will never become invisible, it is usually placed under the swimsuit line so it is covered by clothes. It normally takes nine months to a year before scars flatten out and lighten in color.

Possible risks of abdominoplasty include:
 Bleeding
 Fluid accumulation
 Poor wound healing
 Skin loss
 Numbness or other changes in skin sensation
 Anesthesia complications
 Skin discoloration and/or prolonged swelling
 Fatty tissue found deep in the skin might die (fat necrosis)
 Major wound separation
 Asymmetry
 Recurrent looseness of skin
 Pain, which may persist
 Persistent swelling in the legs
 Nerve damage
 Possibility of revisional surgery
 Hematoma (may occur in 3–4% of cases)
 Keloid (heavy scar)
 Seroma
 Suture rupture
 Swelling
 Visible scar
 Death

Related procedures
Liposuction, also known as lipoplasty, is a type of surgery that removes fat from the human body in an attempt to change its shape. Evidence does not support an effect on weight beyond a couple of months and it does not appear to affect obesity related problems. Serious complications include but are not limited to death, deep vein thrombosis, organ perforation, bleeding, and infection. While the suctioned fat cells are permanently gone, after a few months overall body fat generally returned to the same level as before treatment. This is despite maintaining the previous diet and exercise regimen. While the fat returned somewhat to the treated area, most of the increased fat occurred in the abdominal area. Visceral fat – the fat surrounding the internal organs – increased, and this condition has been linked to life-shortening diseases such as diabetes, stroke, and heart attack.

Body contouring is plastic surgery performed to different parts of the body with the aim of improving the shape and tone of the underlying tissue that supports fat. It is a common procedure performed for people who have undergone major weight loss. It may be performed in both men and women.

Breast reduction, or reduction mammoplasty, is the cosmetic surgery used in resizing the breast, in women with oversized breasts and men with gynecomastia. This type of surgery is performed to treat a breast condition known as hypertrophy, which refers to oversized breasts. This condition usually occurs in both breasts and commonly develops at puberty or immediately after.

Breast lift, also referred to as mastopexy, is the surgical procedure that removes the excess skin and tightens the surrounding tissue of the breast, resulting in raising and firming the breast. Mastopexies carry a certain degree of risks as any other type of surgery does.

Hysterectomies are sometimes performed with abdominoplasty. A hysterectomy consists in removing the uterus and it may be complete (when the body, fundus and cervix are removed) or partial (when only the uterine body is surgically removed). This procedure is normally performed by gynecologists and it is one of the most common gynecological surgeries. This type of surgery is used to treat some benign tumors, cancers of the ovaries, uterus or cervix, Adenomyosis but not endometriosis and are also performed in trans men.

Image gallery

See also
 Abdominal etching

References

Plastic surgery
Surgical removal procedures